Visceral afferent may refer to:

 General visceral afferent fibers
 Special visceral afferent